Xylophanes alexandrei is a moth of the  family Sphingidae. It is known from Ecuador and Peru.

References

alexandrei
Moths described in 2009